Łukasz Bodnar (born 10 May 1982) is a Polish former road bicycle racer, who competed professionally between 2003 and 2016 for the , , , and  teams. He is the brother of fellow racing cyclist Maciej Bodnar.

Major results

2000
 3rd  Time trial, UCI Junior Road World Championships
2001
 6th Overall Course 4 Asy Fiata Autopoland
2002
 3rd Paris–Mantes-en-Yvelines
 3rd GP Ostrowca Swietokrzyskiego
2003
 4th Pasmem Gór Świętokrzyskich
2004
 1st  Time trial, National Under-23 Road Championships
 9th Time trial, UCI Under-23 Road World Championships
 10th Time trial, UEC European Under-23 Road Championships
2005
 4th Overall Course de la Solidarité Olympique
2006
 2nd Time trial, National Road Championships
 3rd Overall Course de la Solidarité Olympique
 10th E.O.S. Tallinn GP
2007
 1st  Time trial, National Road Championships
 1st Overall Course de la Solidarité Olympique
1st Stage 4 (ITT)
 5th Overall Tour du Poitou-Charentes
 8th Overall Bałtyk–Karkonosze Tour
2008
 1st  Time trial, National Road Championships
 1st Overall Course de la Solidarité Olympique
1st Stage 4 (ITT)
 1st Stage 5 (TTT) Dookoła Mazowsza
 2nd Overall Bałtyk–Karkonosze Tour
 4th Memoriał Andrzeja Trochanowskiego
 6th Overall Okolo Slovenska
2009
 1st  Overall Dookoła Mazowsza
1st Stage 3 (ITT)
 1st Stage 8 Tour du Maroc
2010
 1st Stage 3 (ITT) Szlakiem Grodów Piastowskich
 4th Overall Szlakiem Walk Majora Hubala
 8th Overall Tour de Seoul
2011
 2nd Time trial, National Road Championships
 3rd Overall Szlakiem Grodów Piastowskich
 3rd Overall Tour of Małopolska
 4th Puchar Ministra Obrony Narodowej
 9th Duo Normand (with Mateusz Taciak)
2012
 3rd Time trial, National Road Championships
 5th Overall Szlakiem Grodów Piastowskich
2013
 1st  Overall Tour of Małopolska
1st  Mountains classification
1st Stage 2
 3rd Road race, National Road Championships
 3rd Puchar Ministra Obrony Narodowej
2014
 3rd Overall Memorial Grundmanna I Wizowskiego
 3rd Memoriał Andrzeja Trochanowskiego
 5th Memoriał Henryka Łasaka
2015
 7th Memoriał Andrzeja Trochanowskiego
2016
 6th Overall Course de la Solidarité Olympique
 8th Memorial Grundmanna I Wizowskiego

References

External links

Polish male cyclists
1982 births
Living people
Sportspeople from Wrocław